Robert Gimson is a former American football running back for the Carnegie Mellon Tartans (Division III) of the University Athletic Association.  One of only four 1,000-yard rushers in his school's history, having surpassed the 1,000-yard mark twice.  He is 4th on the Tartans' career rushing list (2712).  Robert set numerous records as a three-time 1st Team All Conference Selection, including longest rush (90 yards), single season yards per carry (6.7) and career yards per carry (5.7).

Currently married to Kimberly Gimson a renowned flutist.

References

1986 births
Living people
People from Bloomfield, New Jersey
American football running backs
Carnegie Mellon University alumni